Kravarsko is a municipality in Croatia in the Zagreb County. According to the 2011 census, there are 1,987 inhabitants, absolute majority of which are Croats.

References

Populated places in Zagreb County
Municipalities of Croatia